The following is a list of films originally produced and/or distributed theatrically by Paramount Pictures and released in the 1970s.

References

External links
 Paramount Pictures Complete Library

 1970-1979
American films by studio
1970s in American cinema
Lists of 1970s films